= Conrad Yunker =

American biologist

Conrad E. Yunker
- Occupation: Biologist

Conrad E. Yunker is an American biologist and Elected Fellow of the American Association for the Advancement of Science.
